On April 9, 2022, an eighteen-year-old Mexican woman named Debanhi Susana Escobar Bazaldúa, disappeared. Thirteen days later on April 22, her remains were found in a cistern, in a motel in General Escobedo, a municipality of Monterrey metropolitan area. The body had visible signs of violence. The killing of Escobar triggered unrest in Mexico after a picture of her standing on a road on the night of her disappearance went viral on social media. The case, investigated by the Nuevo León prosecutor's office as a femicide, happened amid a crisis of missing women in Nuevo León and throughout Mexico.

Background 
Debanhi Susana Escobar Bazaldúa (born Monterrey, Nuevo León, 4 September 2003 – 21 April 2022) was a law student, daughter of Mario Escobar and Dolores Bazaldúa, who at the time of her death was 18 years old. Her disappearance and death occurred in a critical context of increasing forced disappearances of women in Mexico. According to the United Nations Committee on Enforced Disappearances, four Mexican states maintain critical levels of missing women: Campeche, Chiapas, Tabasco, and Yucatán. Most of the missing women are girls and adolescents between 10 and 19 years old. In 50 years, 1790 women have been reported missing, 90% of which were reported after 2010, while in 2022 there were 52 female victims of this crime in Nuevo León, according to official reports.

For political context, at the time of Escobar's death the governor of Nuevo Leon was Samuel Garcia, the mayor of Ciudad Escobedo was Andres Mijes Llovera, the state security secretary was Aldo Fasci Zuazua, and the state attorney general was Gustavo Adolfo Guerrero Gutierrez.

Events 
On April 8, 2022, Escobar went with two friends to a party at the Quinta Diamante estate in General Escobedo. As the night went on Escobar's behaviour became uncharacteristically erratic, and she got involved in an altercation and locked herself in the men's bathroom. After 01:20 the following day (April 9) her friends called a DiDi driver to take her home. The driver picked her up and the two were later seen by security footage to be arguing in the car. According to a subsequent explanation by the driver, he was trying to ascertain Escobar's home address or a guardian's phone number, but Escobar was angry, refused to provide either of these details, and groped him. At 04:25 on kilometer 15.5 of the Vía Numancia and Vía a Nuevo Laredo highway in the Nueva Castilla neighborhood, Escobar left the vehicle. The driver exchanged messages with Escobar's friend to discuss the situation, accompanied by a photograph of Escobar standing alone on the desolated highway. This would be the last photograph of Escobar. After several minutes of waiting the driver left. Security footage indicates that at 04:30 she sought help at Alcosa transportation offices, but no one answered her. Later, security cameras record her walking towards the Nueva Castilla Motel.

Escobar's father, Mario, reported his daughter's disappearance to the Nuevo León State Attorney General's Office. The missing person report for Escobar began to be shared on social networks and in the media accompanied by the iconic photograph her driver captured of her on the highway.

Thirteen days later on April 22, Escobar's decomposing body was found in the water of the Nueva Castilla Motel's cistern.

Investigation 
The search for Escobar – done by a special operation after the media coverage of the disappearance, by the Nuevo León State Attorney General's Office (FGJENL, in Spanish) – located five adolescents who were still missing.

Once the body was located, a government autopsy concluded that she had fallen in, hit her head, and drowned. However, Escobar's father distrusted this version of events and had a second autopsy conducted. This second autopsy revealed sexual and physical abuse had occurred prior to Escobar's death. The cause of her death was ruled to be "deep cranial contusion."

Several aspects of Escobar's case remain unexplained. The cause of Escobar's erratic behaviour on the night of her disappearance is unclear, with possibilities including alcohol intoxication and voluntary or involuntary intake of drugs. Secondly, no perpetrator of the homicide has been identified. Lastly, it is unknown whether the initial autopsy was incorrect due to incompetence or corruption.

Social impact 

Escobar's case galvanised Mexican society. Protests around the country started when the news of the disappearance emerged, and they continued until after Escobar's body was found. Hundreds of women marched through the Mexican capital and several cities in other states. The demonstrators, mainly women, carried signs reading "No to Harassment" and "Mexico is a mass grave." Protesters chanted for justice while carrying banners that said: "more than 24,000 women are missing". In Mexico, the number of missing people has risen to over 100,000.

NGOs that handle issues on human rights and the disappearances of people spoke to the media, saying that the human rights violations in Mexico are worse than people can imagine. Leticia Hidalgo, founder of the organisation FUNDENL reported:  "This is a humanitarian tragedy. I want people to know that Debanhi's case is just the tip of the iceberg of what is happening here in Nuevo León".

References 

2022 crimes in Mexico
Escobar, Debanhi
People murdered in Mexico